Bindows is a JavaScript based Software Development Kit (SDK) for writing rich web applications. Bindows applications are defined by XML documents called ADF's (Application Description File). The framework implementation is entirely client-side, but a JSF server side implementation is marketed by the same vendor.

Another meaning of Bindows

In Thailand, there is an operating system called "Bindows XD" which is not to be confused with this software. It is a fake Windows XP released early 2004 still in use as of 2009.

Features
Some highlight features of the Bindows SDK are:
 Native XML, SOAP and XML-RPC support
 Accessibility (Section 508) Support
 Complete windowing system
 Vector Graphics support

Relevance
It has been claimed that Bindows is probably the leading object-oriented platform for developing Ajax applications. While this might be true for implementations in large enterprises (Bindows is used by 91 of the Fortune 100 companies, 85 of The Global 100 companies, and 352 of the Global 500 companies, according to its website), many open-source AJAX frameworks are more widely spread.

Relevance to developers
Bindows is the underlying client technology used in System 9.

Notes

References

External links
 
 
 

Ajax (programming)
JavaScript libraries
Rich web application frameworks
Software development kits
Year of introduction missing